Rockingham County is the name of three counties in the United States of America:

Rockingham County, New Hampshire
Rockingham County, North Carolina
Rockingham County, Virginia